The 2013 Spengler Cup was held in Davos, Switzerland from 26 to 31 December 2013. All matches were played at HC Davos's home known as Vaillant Arena. Six competing teams were split into two groups of three. The two groups, named Torriani and Cattini, were named after legendary Swiss hockey players Richard 'Bibi' Torriani and the Cattini brothers, Hans and Ferdinand.

Teams participating
The list of teams that have been confirmed for the tournament are as listed:

  HC Davos (host)
  Team Canada
  Rochester Americans
  Genève-Servette HC
  HC Vítkovice Steel
  HC CSKA Moscow

The division of the six teams into two groups of three and the subsequent schedule were determined on 12 August 2013.

Match Officials
Here is the full list of match officials that has been confirmed for the tournament at this time:

Publications
Once again this year, the Spengler Cup will make all of their available publications, including all matchday programmes and the event media guide, available for download on their website, as they did last year for the first time.

These publications are available in German only.

Group stage

Key
 W (regulation win) – 3 pts.
 OTW (overtime/shootout win) – 2 pts.
 OTL (overtime/shootout loss) – 1 pt.
 L (regulation loss) – 0 pts.

Group Torriani

All times are local (UTC+1).

Group Cattini

All times are local (UTC+1).

Knockout stage

Quarterfinals

All times are local (UTC+1).

Semifinals

All times are local (UTC+1).

Final

All times are local (UTC+1).

Champions

All-Star Team

Statistics

Scoring leaders

GP = Games Played G = Goals; A = Assists; Pts = Points

Television
Several television channels around the world will cover many or all matches of the Spengler Cup. As well as most Swiss channels, here is a listing of who else will cover the tournament:

 Schweizer Radio und Fernsehen (Switzerland, host broadcaster)
 The Sports Network, Réseau des Sports (Canada)
 Eurosport 2, British Eurosport, Eurosport Asia and Pacific, and Eurosport HD
 Nova Sport (Czech Republic, Slovakia)
 Time Warner Cable Sports Channel (New York State (United States))

References

External links
 

2013-14
2013–14 in Swiss ice hockey
2013–14 in Russian ice hockey
2013–14 in Canadian ice hockey
2013–14 in American ice hockey
2013–14 in Czech ice hockey
December 2013 sports events in Europe